
Although the evidence is rare, fossils reveal that there were dinosaurs in New Zealand. Possibly because it lacks the right conditions for fossilisation, only fragments of bone and a few vertebrae have been found there. Because these fossils are only a single bone or a piece of a bone, the dinosaurs' species cannot be identified, but by comparing the fossils with others it can be seen which family or order a given fossil belonged to. Marine fossils are more common than fossils of land animals in New Zealand because dead animals and plants are easily preserved in sand and mud. Therefore, some fossils of large marine reptiles are nearly complete, and so can be identified to species.

Species list
So far, there have been fossils found in New Zealand that have been identified as coming from:

Non-avian dinosaurs 

Dinosaurs that lived in the Ross Dependency, a part of Antarctica within the Realm of New Zealand, include the tetanuran Cryolophosaurus. The Ross Dependency, unlike the Chatham Islands, is not actually part of New Zealand, and this is why it is excluded from the list above until sufficient evidence shows that it entered what was the sector of Gondwana that is now New Zealand. Newer fossils from a Cretaceous-Paleogene boundary fossil formation known as the Takataka Grit in the Chatham Islands include six or seven (possibly more) bones from dinosaurs, as well as numerous bones from early birds, but more information is needed about these to add them to the list.

Other Mesozoic reptiles 

Fossils of other reptiles from the Mesozoic Era have also been found in New Zealand. These creatures include:

See also
Reptiles of New Zealand
Fauna of New Zealand
Geology of New Zealand

References

New Zealand